Percival Sylvester Bailey (May 9, 1892 – August 10, 1973) was an American neuropathologist, neurosurgeon and psychiatrist who was a native of rural southern Illinois.

He originally studied to become a teacher at Southern Illinois Normal University, but transferred to the University of Chicago in 1912, where he became interested in neurology. In 1918 he graduated from Northwestern University in Evanston, and in 1919 became an assistant to Harvey Cushing at Peter Bent Brigham Hospital in Boston. In 1928 he became head of the neurosurgical department at the University of Chicago, and in 1939 was professor of neurology and neurological surgery at the University of Illinois Chicago. From 1951 he was director of the Illinois State Psychiatric Institute.

Percival Bailey is remembered for his collaborative work with Harvey Cushing, and his important work involving the classification of brain tumors, which prior to his research was in a state of disarray and confusion. From 1922 to 1925, Bailey performed extensive pathological and histological studies of brain tumors, and based on cellular configuration, he created a classification system of thirteen categories. In 1927, he reduced the number of categories to ten.

In 1925, Bailey identified a mid-cerebellar glioma that is usually associated with childhood called a medulloblastoma, of which he published an important paper with Cushing titled  Medulloblastoma Cerebelli. The two doctors are credited with coining the term "hemangioblastoma".

With Paul Bucy (1904-1992), Bailey made investigations involving the structure of intracranial tumors and meningeal tumors. The two men were able to confirm that a specific type of tumor (now known as an oligodendroglioma) consisted of oligodendroglia. With Gerhardt von Bonin (1890-1979), Bailey authored two works, "The Neocortex of the Chimpanzee" in 1950 and "The Isocortex of Man" in 1951, which provided an accurate description concerning the cytoarchitecture of the cerebral cortex.

As a psychiatrist, Bailey was a vocal critic of Freudian psychology, which he considered speculative and unscientific. In 1965, he published a book about Freud titled "Sigmund The Unserene".

References 
Bucy, Paul C. "Percival Bailey 1892-1973". Washington D.C.: National Academy of Sciences, 1989.
 Ferguson, Sherise and Maciej S. Lesniak. "Percival Bailey and the Classification of Brain Tumors". Neurosurgical Focus. Vol. 18. No. 4. (April 2005).

External links
National Academy of Sciences Biographical Memoir

American psychiatrists
American neurologists
American neurosurgeons
1973 deaths
1892 births
20th-century surgeons
University of Chicago alumni
Scientists from Illinois
University of Illinois Chicago faculty
University of Chicago faculty
Northwestern University alumni
Southern Illinois University Carbondale alumni
Members of the United States National Academy of Sciences